Jefferson Township is one of fourteen townships in Carroll County, Indiana. As of the 2010 census, its population was 2,162 and it contained 1,658 housing units.

History
Jefferson Township was organized in 1836.

Geography

Cities and towns
 Yeoman

Unincorporated towns
 Breezy Point
 C and C Beach
 Lower Sunset Park
 Patton
 Roth Park
 Sandy Beach
 Scarlet Oaks
 Sleeth
 Terrace Bay
 Upper Sunset Park
 Walnut Gardens
(This list is based on USGS data and may include former settlements.)

Adjacent townships
 Lincoln Township, White County (northeast)
 Adams (east)
 Tippecanoe (south)
 Prairie Township, White County (southwest)
 Big Creek Township, White County (west)
 Union Township, White County (northwest)

Major highways
  U.S. Route 421

Cemeteries
The township contains two cemeteries: Schock and Yeoman.

Education
Jefferson Township residents may obtain a library card at the Delphi Public Library in Delphi.

References
 
 United States Census Bureau cartographic boundary files

External links

 Indiana Township Association
 United Township Association of Indiana

Townships in Carroll County, Indiana
Lafayette metropolitan area, Indiana
Townships in Indiana
1836 establishments in Indiana
Populated places established in 1836